Extended Play Two is an EP by British indie electronic band Broadcast. It was released on 19 September 2000 by Warp in the UK and Tommy Boy Records in the US. The EP was recorded by the group after the release of their debut album, The Noise Made by People. The EP featured non-album songs as well as a re-recorded version of "Unchanging Window" with the instrumental coda "Chord Simple" interwoven with the end of the song. It also included the track "Drums on Fire", previously issued only as a promo 12".

The sleeve was designed by Julian House.

Track listing

References

Broadcast (band) EPs
2000 EPs
Tommy Boy Records EPs